Ibragim Yuryevich Tsallagov (born 12 December 1990) is a Russian professional footballer who plays for PFC Sochi primarily as a defensive midfielder. He also played as a right back and right midfielder.

Club career

He made his Russian Premier League debut on 13 March 2010 for FC Krylia Sovetov Samara in a game against FC Zenit St. Petersburg.

On 30 December 2016, he signed a 3.5-year contract with FC Zenit Saint Petersburg.

On 2 August 2017, he joined FC Dynamo Moscow on loan for the 2017–18 season. On 28 July 2018, he moved on loan to FC Rubin Kazan for the 2018–19 season.

On 2 July 2019, he left Zenit for PFC Sochi.

Personal life
He is a cousin of Dzambolat Tsallagov.

Career statistics

Notes

References

External links
 

1990 births
Sportspeople from Vladikavkaz
Russian people of Ingush descent
Ingush people
Russian Muslims
Living people
Russian footballers
Russia youth international footballers
Russia under-21 international footballers
Association football defenders
Association football midfielders
PFC Krylia Sovetov Samara players
FC Zenit Saint Petersburg players
FC Dynamo Moscow players
FC Rubin Kazan players
PFC Sochi players
Russian Premier League players
Russian First League players